James Lumsden Barkway (9 July 187812 December 1968) was a bishop in the 20th century.

Biography
He was born on 9 July 1878 and educated at Liverpool University and  Westminster College, Cambridge. After ten years as a Presbyterian minister his first Anglican ministry position was as a minor canon at St Albans Cathedral from where he moved to be vicar of Christ Church, Luton. He was made deacon on Trinity Sunday 1916 (18 June) and ordained priest the following Trinity Sunday (3 June 1917) — both times by Edgar Jacob, Bishop of St Albans, at the cathedral. Following time as Rector of Little Gaddesden, he was appointed the Bishop of Bedford in 1935. He was consecrated a bishop by Cosmo Lang, Archbishop of Canterbury, at St Paul's Cathedral on Whit Tuesday 1935 (11 June).

Barkway wrote a popular apologetic presentation of the Niceno-Constantinopolitan Creed, The Creed and its Credentials.

Three years later he was translated to be the Bishop of St Andrews, Dunkeld and Dunblane where he stayed for eleven years. He resigned his See in May 1949.

He retired to Kingscote, Gloucestershire, where he undertook some bishop's duties; he died at home in Coulsdon, Greater London, on 12 December 1968, aged 90.

References

1878 births
1968 deaths
Alumni of the University of Liverpool
Archdeacons of St Albans
Bishops of Bedford
Bishops of Saint Andrews, Dunkeld and Dunblane
20th-century Scottish Episcopalian bishops

19th-century Anglican theologians
20th-century Anglican theologians